Lemyra kuangtungensis is a moth of the family Erebidae. It was described by Franz Daniel in 1954. It is found in China (Guangdong, Jiangxi, Guangxi, Hunan, Hainan).

References

 

kuangtungensis
Moths described in 1954